Stony Mountain may refer to:

Stony Mountain (Colorado), a summit in Ouray County, Colorado
Stony Mountain, Manitoba, a community in Canada
Stony Mountain (Missouri), a summit in Missouri